Rudolf Jung (16 April 1882 – 11 December 1945) was an instrumental figure and agitator in the German Bohemian Nazi movement, and later became a member of the Nazi Party.

Jung was born in Plasy in Bohemia and went to school in Jihlava, a town fractured by national antagonisms. He was a civil engineer employed by the national railways of Austria-Hungary. In 1909, he joined the German Workers' Party (DAP) and became an ardent party agitator. Because of his political activism, Jung was fired, but the party put him on its payroll and he devoted himself to theoretical work.

Along with Dr. Walter Riehl, Jung drafted the Jihlava party program of 1913 "which contained a more detailed comparison of international Marxism and national socialism and a more pointed attack on Capitalism, Democracy, alien peoples, and Jews. Here, anti-semitism ranked behind anti-Slavism, anti-clericalism and anti-capitalism."  In 1919, Jung completed his theoretical work Der Nationale Sozialismus.  In his introduction, he expressed the hope that his book would play the same role for National Socialism that Das Kapital had for Marxian socialism.

At the end of World War I, the DAP was renamed the Deutsche Nationalsozialistische Arbeiterpartei (DNSAP). Jung convinced Hitler to include the term "National Socialist" in the name of the German Workers' Party, the DAP's counterpart in Germany. Hitler originally wanted to rename the German DAP the "Social Revolutionary Party".

Some of the posts Jung held were: President of the State Labour office in Middle Germany, Gauleiter ad Honorem (honorary), and in 1936, Member of the Reichstag for the district of Westphalia South. In 1943, Jung became the Reich Inspector and Director of the Reich Inspection of Labour Administration.

He wrote several books, including Der nationale Sozialismus: seine Grundlagen, sein Werdegang und seine Ziele (National Socialism, its Foundations, Development and Goals), Aussig, 1919.  2nd ed.; Munich: Deutscher Volksverlag Dr. Boepple, 1922.

After the war he was detained by Czechoslovak authorities and imprisoned. He died by suicide in Prague's Pankrác prison before his trial for Nazi activities.

See also
 	
 List of people who died by suicide by hanging

References

1882 births
1945 suicides
People from Plasy
People from the Kingdom of Bohemia
German Bohemian people
German Workers' Party (Austria-Hungary) politicians
German National Socialist Workers' Party (Czechoslovakia) politicians
Nazi Party officials
Nazi Party politicians
Members of the Chamber of Deputies of Czechoslovakia (1920–1925)
Members of the Chamber of Deputies of Czechoslovakia (1925–1929)
Members of the Chamber of Deputies of Czechoslovakia (1929–1935)
Members of the Reichstag of Nazi Germany
Nazis who committed suicide in prison custody